Robin E. Mitchell (born 10 March 1946 in Levuka) is a Fijian sports official.

A practicing medical doctor since 1977, he obtained his medical degree at Adelaide University in Australia. He was the team physician for Fijian athletes at the Olympic Games, Commonwealth Games and South Pacific Games from 1984 to 1992. In 1994, he was elected as a member of the International Olympic Committee (IOC), and remains a member to this day.

He served as Chairman of the South Pacific Games Organising Committee from 1997 to 2003, and simultaneously as President of the Fiji Association of Sports and National Olympic Committee from 1997 to 2005. He was Vice-President (1989-1993) then Secretary General (1993-2009) of the Oceania National Olympic Committees, and has served as its President since 2009. He is also, since 2001, a member of the Foundation Board of the World Anti-Doping Agency.

References

Living people
Fijian referees and umpires
World Anti-Doping Agency members
International Olympic Committee members
1946 births
People from Levuka
Fijian people of British descent
University of Adelaide alumni
Fijian sports physicians